Lope De Vega (foaled 19 February 2007) is a retired Irish bred Thoroughbred racehorse and current breeding stallion.

2-year-old

Lope De Vega began his racing career at Deauville as a 2 year old on 26 August 2009, where he won by 2½ lengths. He also won his next race at Longchamp on 13 September 2009 before stepping up in class to Group One level for the first time in the Prix Jean Luc Lagadere. Lope De Vega was beaten for the first time by Siyouni in the Prix Jean Luc Lagadere - he finished 4th.

3-year-old

Lope De Vega's first start as a 3 year old came in the Prix De Fontainebleau on 25 April 2010, a noted trial for the Poule d'Essai des Poulains, and he finished 3rd behind the Aga Khan owned duo, Rajasaman, who won, and Siyouni, who finished 2nd. Lope De Vega's major breakthrough came in the Poule d'Essai des Poulains at Longchamp on 16 May 2010. Drawn wide in stall 15, Lope De Vega was held up until the top of straight, where he was pulled out wide to make his challenge, and he ran down 2000 Guineas runner up Dick Turpin to win by 1/2 length.  Lope De Vega followed up his first Group 1 win winning the Prix Du Jockey Club by 3 lengths, which is the biggest winning distance in the race since it was reduced to 2100m in 2005. He was again drawn wide in stall 20, but he tracked across from the wide draw to take up a prominent position and drew clear in the straight to win eased down. In winning the Prix Du Jockey Club as well as the Poule d'Essai des Poulains, he emulated his sire Shamardal who won both races in 2005.

Stud career

In 2011, Lope De Vega retired from racing and stood at Ballylinch Stud, Ireland and shuttled to Patinack Farm, Queensland Australia.

As of 2021, Lope De Vega's service fee is €125,000.

Notable progeny

Lope De Vega has currently sired 16 individual Group/Grade 1 winners:

c = colt, f = filly, g = gelding''

References

2007 racehorse births
Racehorses bred in Ireland
Racehorses trained in France
French Thoroughbred Classic Race winners
Thoroughbred family 11-d